Battle of Lasy Królewskie (Polish: Bitwa w Lasach Królewskich, Battle of Royal Forests) refers to the battle on 1 September 1939 near Janowo and Krzynowłoga Mała during the Battle of the Border of the Invasion of Poland.

The German Third Army attacked towards Warsaw from East Prussia, but became entangled by the Mlawa fortifications.  Panzer Division Kempf and two divisions of the 1st Corps were stopped by the Polish 20th Infantry Division.  The Wodrig Corps could not flank the Polish position due to the swampy ground.  Along the Ulatkowka river, Polish Uhlan cavalry (elements of 11th Cavalry "Legions'" Regiment) stopped attacks by the German 1st Cavalry Brigade. Rather than a mounted fight, most were dismounted. However, the Poles did stall the German Third Army advance.

See also 

 List of World War II military equipment of Poland
 List of German military equipment of World War II

References

Lasy Krolewskie
Warsaw Voivodeship (1919–1939)
September 1939 events
History of Masovian Voivodeship